The 1986 Appalachian State Mountaineers football team was an American football team that represented Appalachian State University as a member of the Southern Conference (SoCon) during the 1986 NCAA Division I-AA football season. In their third year under head coach Sparky Woods, the Mountaineers compiled an overall record of 9–2–1 with a conference mark of  6–0–1, winning the SoCon title. Appalachian State advanced to the NCAA Division I-AA Football Championship playoff, where they lost in the first round to Nicholls State.

Schedule

References

Appalachian State
Appalachian State Mountaineers football seasons
Southern Conference football champion seasons
Appalachian State Mountaineers football